Charles Lyon (born April 10, 1992) is an American soccer coach and former player.

Career

College and amateur
Lyon spent his entire college career at Marquette University.  After medically redshirting his first year in 2010, Lyon made a total of 63 appearances for the Golden Eagles and finished his career with a 0.83 GAA and recorded 29 clean sheets.

He also played in the PDL for Chicago Fire U-23.

Professional
On January 20, 2015, Lyon was selected in the fourth round (75th overall) in the 2015 MLS SuperDraft by Seattle Sounders FC.  He signed a professional contract with the club on March 17.  He made his professional debut for USL affiliate club Seattle Sounders FC 2 in a 4–2 victory against Sacramento Republic FC. After being released by the Sounders, Lyon went to Minnesota United for a trial period ahead of their inaugural MLS season. The trial didn't work out, and on February 15, 2017, Lyon signed a contract with Orange County SC.

Lyon joined MLS side Los Angeles FC on March 2, 2018 ahead of their inaugural season. On May 22, 2018, he made his LAFC debut in a friendly against Borussia Dortmund. He was released by LAFC at the end of the season and became the MLS pool goalkeeper, joining various teams for short stints to fill unoccupied roster spots for goalkeepers. He is currently based in Portland, Oregon, and trains with the Portland Timbers. Lyon's contract as MLS pool goalkeeper was not renewed in 2020 and he was hired by a logging company in Southwestern Washington amid the COVID-19 pandemic. He was then selected to join the MLS is Back Tournament as the pool goalkeeper. During the tournament, Lyon was brought in as Sporting KC's backup keeper for a match after Tim Melia's red card against Minnesota United. Then, when the Vancouver Whitecaps were left with only a 20-year-old, third-string keeper, Lyon was prevented from helping the Canadian side over complications with his international transfer certificate. In September 2020, FC Dallas added Lyon to shore up their squad for matches against Minnesota United and Houston Dynamo.

Coaching
Following his retirement from playing, Lyon took the role of goalkeeping coach at the Saint Mary's Gaels soccer team.

Honors
Seattle Sounders FC
 MLS Cup: 2016

References

External links

Marquette University bio
 

1992 births
Living people
American soccer players
Association football goalkeepers
Chicago Fire U-23 players
Los Angeles FC players
Marquette Golden Eagles men's soccer players
Orange County SC players
People from St. Charles, Illinois
Philadelphia Union players
Portland Timbers 2 players
Seattle Sounders FC draft picks
Seattle Sounders FC players
Tacoma Defiance players
Soccer players from Illinois
Sportspeople from DuPage County, Illinois
Sportspeople from Kane County, Illinois
USL Championship players
USL League Two players
Saint Mary's Gaels men's soccer coaches
Association football goalkeeping coaches